James Haydn Tasman Collins (born 25 February 2000) is a field hockey player from Australia, who plays as a defender.

Personal life
James Collins was born and raised in Perth, Western Australia.

Career

Domestic hockey
In 2019, Collins was a member of the Perth Thundersticks team for the inaugural season of the Sultana Bran Hockey One League.

National teams

Under–18
James Collins made his debut for Australia in 2018, where he was a member of the Under–18 team at the Oceania Youth Championship in Port Moresby. Later that year he captained the team at the Youth Olympics in Buenos Aires.

Kookaburras
In 2022, Collins was named in the Kookaburras squad for the first time. In April of that year, he made his senior international debut in a test series against Malaysia in Perth.

References

External links
 
 

2000 births
Living people
Australian male field hockey players
Male field hockey defenders
Field hockey players at the 2018 Summer Youth Olympics